The name Hiwassee is derived from the Cherokee word Ayuhwasi, meaning "savanna" or "large meadow".  The name has been applied to several entities past and present in the U.S. states of Georgia, North Carolina, and Tennessee:

Bodies of water
 Hiwassee Lake, the reservoir created by Hiwassee Dam
 Hiwassee River, a tributary of the Tennessee River in northern Georgia, western North Carolina, and eastern Tennessee

Towns
 Ducktown, Tennessee, called Hiawassee in the 1840s–1850s
 Hiawassee, Georgia, a town
 Hiwasse, Arkansas, a town
 Great Hiwassee, a Cherokee village once located along the Hiwassee River in Polk County, Tennessee
 Hiwassee, North Carolina, a small community adjacent to Hiwassee Dam
 Little Hiwassee, a Cherokee village once located along the Hiwassee River in Cherokee County, North Carolina
 Hiwassee, Virginia, a census-designated place in Virginia

Other
 Hiwassee College, a college in Madisonville, Tennessee
 Hiwassee Dam, a hydroelectric dam on the Hiwassee River in Cherokee County, North Carolina
 USS Hiwassee (AOG-29), a 1944 Mettawee-class gasoline tanker